The men's 5000 metres event at the 2002 Commonwealth Games was held on 31 July.

Results

References
Official results
Results at BBC

5000
2002